The Kuki Christian Church (KCC) is an association which is part of the National Council of Churches in India (NCCI). Through the NCCI, the KCC is part of the World Council of Churches (WCC).

Administration
Kuki Christian Church is governed by the Assembly of the Synods. Each synods has an executive secretary, and an annual conference takes place where moderators and leaders of the assembly are chosen by representatives of the synods. The head of the congregation is T. Lunkim.

The synods and their headquarters are:
Kuki Christian Church, Nagaland Synod, Mission Compound, Molvom
Kuki Christian Church, Tripura Synod, Damcherra, North Tripura
Kuki Christian Church, Assam Synod, Songpijang, NC Hills
Kuki Christian Church, Manipur Synod, Dewlahlane, Imphal

Institutions
In addition to evangelism and other church activities, the KCC gives equal importance to human-resource development with Christian values.
The congregation has established Trulock Theological Seminary, Imphal, Manipur Synod. The seminary offers B.Th. BD and M.Div degrees.

See also
 Kuki people
 Kukish languages
 Kuki Baptist Convention

References

External links
 ECCI 
 Kuki

Religious organizations established in 1885
Baptist denominations established in the 19th century
Protestantism in India
1885 establishments in India
Kuki tribes